Wales participated in the Junior Eurovision Song Contest 2019 held in Gliwice, Poland on 24 November 2019. The Welsh broadcaster S4C was responsible for organising their second entry for the contest. Erin was selected through Chwilio am Seren to represent Wales, winning the televised national final on 24 September at the Venue Cymru in Llandudno. The winning song, "Calon yn Curo", was chosen internally by S4C and composed by Eurovision Song Contest 2010 performers, Sylvia Strand and producer Jonathan Gregory, with the lyrics written by rapper and composer Ed Holden.

Background

Wales announced on 9 May 2018 that they would debut at the Junior Eurovision Song Contest 2018 held in Minsk, Belarus. Welsh broadcaster S4C was responsible for the country's participation in the contest.

A televised national selection process, Chwilio am Seren (English: Search for a Star), was held to select the Welsh entrant. Manw won the national final, held at the Venue Cymru in Llandudno, on 9 October to represent Wales with the internally selected song "Perta", written by Ywain Gwynedd. Wales came last in their debut year at the Junior Eurovision Song Contest. Manw and her song "Perta" received no jury points and only 29 points from the online voting.

S4C had also shown interest in participating in the  contest, but in the end decided against participating.

Before Junior Eurovision

Chwilio am Seren
Chwilio am Seren (Search for a Star) was the national selection process used to select the 2019 entrant. Auditions took take place during April and May 2019 with mentors Connie Fisher, Lloyd Macey and Tara Bethan as the judging panel. The four-part series, produced by Rondo Media for S4C, was aired on Tuesday nights with a repeat broadcast of the first three episodes on Sunday afternoons. The series began on 3 September 2019, seeing three weeks of auditions, before the live grand final on 24 September 2019, held in Llandudno.

The first two shows covered the nationwide auditions. Following a masterclass round at S4C's headquarters in Carmarthen (on the campus of the University of Wales Trinity Saint Davids), the final twenty singers were wittled down to the top 12 who then performed in public at Quadrant Shopping Centre in Swansea. The jury decided at the end of these performances who would perform during a final round live on television.

Table key
 Participant who was selected to progress to the national final

National final

The national final took place in Llandudno's Venue Cymru on 24 September 2019, hosted by Trystan Ellis-Morris and broadcast live on S4C. The first round saw the six live finalists performing cover songs. Regional juries (Aberystwyth, Llandudno, Carmarthen, Cardiff and London) consisting of two adults and two children awarded stars (points) to their favourite three performers which were announced by a spokesperson. Each performer automatically received one star from each jury. The three mentors, Fisher, Macey and Bethan all gave their opinions on the performances but could not vote. In the second round, the three superfinalists each performed a different arrangement of the official Welsh entry "Calon yn Curo". Public televoting selected the winner from the second round, this being Erin.

The national final opened with the six finalists performing a Welsh version of the anthem of the Junior Eurovision Song Contest 2014, "Together". During the televote window, a recap of the past edition of Chwilio am Seren was broadcast.

Ratings

At Junior Eurovision
During the opening ceremony and the running order draw which both took place on 18 November 2019, Wales was drawn to perform ninth on 24 November 2019, following Malta and preceding Kazakhstan.

On 23 November, S4C broadcast a 30-minute documentary Erin yn Ewrop (Erin in Europe), which followed Erin's journey to the contest. The final was broadcast live in Wales on S4C, with commentary provided by Trystan Ellis-Morris in Welsh. English commentary by Stifyn Parri was available via the red button. It was the 12th most watched show that week on S4C with 24,000 viewers.

Voting

Detailed voting results

References

External links
Chwilio am Seren Junior Eurovision

Junior Eurovision
Countries in the Junior Eurovision Song Contest 2019
Junior